Scalapino is a surname. Notable people with the surname include:

Douglas James Scalapino (born 1933), American physicist
Leslie Scalapino (1944–2010), American poet, experimental prose writer, playwright, essayist, and editor
Robert A. Scalapino (1919–2011), American political scientist